Piojó is a municipality and town in the Colombian department of Atlántico.

References

External links
 Piojo official website
 Gobernacion del Atlantico - Piojó

Municipalities of Atlántico Department